Two Top and Big Top Mesa are two adjacent mesas about  apart in western North Dakota.  They were declared National Natural Landmarks in 1965.  The tops of the mesas are rare examples of undisturbed grassland which have never been grazed or cultivated.   They are located in or around the Little Missouri National Grasslands.

Geology
They are made of sandstone, Morton silt loam and clay.

References

External links

National Natural Landmarks in North Dakota
Protected areas of Billings County, North Dakota
Mesas of the United States
Landforms of North Dakota
Landforms of Billings County, North Dakota